The 2021 season was the New England Patriots' 52nd season in the National Football League, their 62nd overall, their 20th playing home games at Gillette Stadium, and their 22nd under head coach Bill Belichick.

Following the team's 7–9 finish the previous season, their first losing record since 2000, the Patriots spent a record $163 million in guaranteed money to sign new free agent acquisitions. 11 free agents were added to the roster on March 19, with the largest contracts awarded to linebacker Matthew Judon, tight ends Hunter Henry and Jonnu Smith, cornerback Jalen Mills, and wide receiver Nelson Agholor. In the 2021 NFL Draft, New England selected quarterback Mac Jones 15th overall, marking the first time the Patriots drafted a first-round quarterback since Drew Bledsoe in 1993. Jones also became the first rookie quarterback to start for the Patriots since Bledsoe after he was named the starter ahead of the season opener.

The Patriots began the season 2–4, but won eight of their next 11 games and finished with a 10–7 record to secure a wild card berth. In their first playoff appearance without quarterback Tom Brady since 1998 and their first as a wild card under Belichick, they were defeated 17–47 by the division rival Buffalo Bills, the worst postseason loss of Belichick's tenure.

Roster changes

Free agency

Unrestricted

Restricted

Exclusive-rights

Signings/waiver claims

Releases/waivers

Retirements

Trades 
 March 18 - Offensive tackle Marcus Cannon, the Patriots' 2021 fifth-round selection (No. 158 overall), and 2021 sixth-round selection (No. 194 overall) were traded to the Houston Texans for the Texans' 2021 fourth-round selection (No. 122 overall, originally acquired from Arizona) and 2021 sixth-round selection (No. 187 overall).
 March 18 - The Patriots' 2022 fifth-round selection was traded to the Las Vegas Raiders for offensive tackle Trent Brown and the Raiders' 2022 seventh-round selection.
 March 23 - Tight end Ryan Izzo was traded to the Houston Texans for the Texans' 2022 seventh-round selection.
 August 25 - Running back Sony Michel was traded to the Los Angeles Rams for the Rams' 2022 sixth and 2023 fourth round selections.
 August 26 - The Patriots' 2022 seventh-round selection (originally acquired from Houston) and 2023 fifth-round selection were traded to the Baltimore Ravens for cornerback Shaun Wade.
 August 31 - The Patriots' 2022 seventh-round selection was traded to the Kansas City Chiefs for offensive tackle Yasir Durant. 
 October 6 - Cornerback Stephon Gilmore was traded to the Carolina Panthers for the Panthers' 2023 sixth-round selection.

Draft

Notes
The Cincinnati Bengals' 2021 second-round selection (No. 38 overall) was acquired in a trade that sent the Patriots' 2021 second-round selection (No. 46 overall) and two fourth-round selections (No. 122 and 139 overall) to the Bengals.
The Patriots forfeited their third-round selection as the punishment for illegal filming of the field and sidelines by the team's television crew of a 2019 game between the Cincinnati Bengals and Cleveland Browns.
 The Houston Texans' 2021 fourth-round selection (No. 122 overall) and 2021 sixth-round selection (No. 188 overall) were acquired in a trade that sent offensive tackle Marcus Cannon, the Patriots' 2021 fifth-round selection (No. 158 overall), and the previously acquired Dallas Cowboys 2021 sixth-round selection (No. 194 overall) to the Texans.
A sixth-round selection (No. 185 overall) was acquired in a trade that sent wide receiver Demaryius Thomas to the New York Jets. The Jets re-acquired this selection when the Patriots traded two of their 2020 fourth-round selections and this 2021 sixth-round selection in exchange for a 2020 third-round selection.
 An additional sixth-round selection (No. 194 overall) was obtained in the trade that sent defensive end Michael Bennett to the Dallas Cowboys.

Undrafted free agents

Staff
 July 23: Cole Popovich left the team as co-offensive line coach after refusing to receive the COVID-19 vaccine.

Final roster

Preseason

Regular season

Schedule
The Patriots' 2021 schedule was announced on May 12.

Note: Intra-division opponents are in bold text.

Game summaries

Week 1: vs. Miami Dolphins

In rookie quarterback Mac Jones' first NFL start, a back-and-forth affair against divisional opponent Miami was sealed when Patriots running back Damien Harris fumbled the ball in the fourth quarter, allowing the Dolphins to run out the clock. With the close loss, the Patriots began the season 0–1 for the first time since 2017.

Week 2: at New York Jets

A battle of rookie quarterbacks saw Zach Wilson of the Jets throw four interceptions to the Patriots defense, allowing New England to coast to a 25–6 win, its 11th straight win over divisional rival New York. Mac Jones completed over 70% of his passes for the second game in a row.

Week 3: vs. New Orleans Saints

Jones threw three interceptions, including a pass bobbled by tight end Jonnu Smith before being returned by P. J. Williams for a touchdown, as the Patriots lost to the Saints 28–13 and dropped to 1–2. This was also the Patriots' first loss to the Saints since 2009.

Week 4: vs. Tampa Bay Buccaneers

This game marked former Patriots quarterback Tom Brady's first return to Gillette Stadium since leaving the Patriots after the 2019 season, as he was cheered by the Patriots' home crowd during pre-game introductions before being jeered during the game. During the rain-soaked, back-and-forth contest, Brady was held without a touchdown and completed just over half of his passes; he was held to his third lowest passer rating - 70.8 - since joining the Buccaneers but led them to a go-ahead field goal just after the two-minute warning. Jones, who passed for 2 touchdowns and an interception, led the Patriots into position for their own field goal, but Nick Folk's 56-yard attempt hit the left upright, sealing the loss for the Patriots to their former franchise quarterback.

Week 5: at Houston Texans

Despite being down 22–9 to Houston at one point, the Patriots came back to win – coincidentally in the same stadium where they overcame a 28–3 deficit to the Atlanta Falcons to win Super Bowl LI. Aside from a missed extra point in the first half, Nick Folk made four field goals during the game, including the game-winner with 15 seconds left in the game. With the win, New England improved to 2–3, taking sole possession of 2nd place in the AFC East.

Week 6: vs. Dallas Cowboys

This was the Patriots' first overtime game since the 2018 AFC Championship Game against the Kansas City Chiefs. This was the Pats' first loss to the Cowboys in 25 years and their first home loss to them in 34 years.

Week 7: vs. New York Jets

With the win, the Patriots improved to 3–4 and swept the Jets for the sixth consecutive season and have won 12 straight meetings.

Week 8: at Los Angeles Chargers

With the win, the Patriots improved to 4–4 on the season. It was the Patriots' seventh straight win over the Chargers. Their last loss came on October 12, 2008 in San Diego.

Week 9: at Carolina Panthers

The Patriots intercepted Panthers quarterback Sam Darnold three times en route to victory, including an 88-yard pick-six by J.C. Jackson. New England improved to 5–4 on the year and 4-0 all-time vs. Darnold. This was also the Patriots first win over the Panthers since 2009.

Week 10: vs. Cleveland Browns

The Patriots outplayed the Browns on both sides of the ball. Mac Jones had one of his better games as a rookie, completing over 80 percent of his passes for three touchdowns and no interceptions as the Patriots converted 7 of 9 third downs. The defense only allowed points on the first drive of the game, held the Browns to 1 of 11 on third down, and knocked Browns quarterback Baker Mayfield out of the game in the third quarter. With Damien Harris sidelined with a concussion from the Panthers game, Rhamondre Stevenson served as the primary running back, rushing for 100 yards and two touchdowns. With the score 38–7 in the fourth quarter, Brian Hoyer replaced Jones and threw the pass that ended Jakobi Meyers' record touchdown drought.

Week 11: at Atlanta Falcons

The Patriots defense intercepted all three quarterbacks on the Falcons—Matt Ryan, Josh Rosen, and Feleipe Franks—as New England coasted to a 25–0 win over Atlanta on Thursday Night Football, improving to 7–4. They would gain the AFC East division lead later in the week after the Buffalo Bills lost to the Indianapolis Colts.

Week 12: vs. Tennessee Titans

The Patriots defense put up a show against a banged up Titans team. The offense was only forced to punt once but struggled to finish drives and get the run game going, resulting in five Nick Folk field goals.  Mac Jones threw for 310 yards, and completed a pair of touchdown passes to Kendrick Bourne, with Damien Harris adding a touchdown late in the fourth quarter on the ground.  Cornerback J. C. Jackson secured his seventh interception of the season, while the rest of the defense forced five fumbles, three of which were recovered by the Patriots.  The Patriots improved to 8-4 for the AFC East division lead and an overall second place in the AFC.

Week 13: at Buffalo Bills

The Patriots entered the game in first place in the AFC following the Baltimore Ravens' loss the previous day, and were playing for first place in the AFC East. The game was impacted by 40 mile-per-hour winds; Belichick noted after the game that the winds in the Patriots' Week 17 game in Buffalo in 2008 were "way worse".

The Patriots drew up a run-heavy game plan in which Jones attempted just three passes, completing two for 19 yards (in 2008, Cassel completed six of eight passes for 78 yards). The Patriots ran the ball 46 times, for over 220 yards, utilizing a sixth offensive lineman on the majority of their offensive snaps. The three pass attempts were the fewest in a game since 1974 (when the Bills attempted just two in a game), the fewest in franchise history, and the fewest by a winning team in 30 years.

The Patriots defense was also stout: the Bills' only touchdown came after a N'Keal Harry muffed punt, and Myles Bryant broke up a fourth-down pass in the red zone late in the fourth quarter to preserve the Patriots' 14–10 win.

The Patriots had their bye week after this game, making it their latest regular-season bye since their Week 16 bye in 2001.

Week 15: at Indianapolis Colts

The Patriots were flat for much of the game, being shut out in the first half for the first time in 99 games. A late second half comeback brought the Patriots to within three points, but fell short when Jonathan Taylor put the game away with a 67-yard touchdown run. With the loss, the Patriots fell to the #3 seed in the AFC prior to Week 15's Sunday games, while still maintaining first place in the AFC East. It was also the first time the Patriots lost to the Colts since Week 10 of the 2009 season.

Week 16: vs. Buffalo Bills

This was the first time in five years the Pats and the Bills split the season series.  Because of this loss (their second straight after a bye week), the Pats fell to the #6 seed in the AFC playoff picture.

Week 17: vs. Jacksonville Jaguars

A blowout win combined with a Dolphins loss sent the Patriots back to the postseason, following a 1-year absence.

Week 18: at Miami Dolphins

This was the first time since 2000 that the Patriots were swept by the Dolphins.

Standings

Division

Conference

Postseason

Schedule

Game summaries

AFC Wild Card Playoffs: at (3) Buffalo Bills
In New England's first playoff game since the departure of quarterback Tom Brady, they were unable to stop the Bills and quarterback Josh Allen defensively, with the Bills being the first team in NFL history to never punt, kick a field goal or turn the ball over on any of their drives (every Buffalo offensive possession ended in a touchdown or was the end of the game). It was the New England Patriots' worst playoff loss in franchise history.

Statistics

Team

Individual

Statistics correct as of the end of the 2021 NFL season

References

External links

 

New England Patriots
New England Patriots seasons
New England Patriots
Sports competitions in Foxborough, Massachusetts